PGMS may refer to:

Physician Group Management Services
Punta Gorda Middle School
Platinum Group Metals
Piney Grove Middle School